The Louisa–Muscatine Community School District is rural public school district consisting of an elementary school and a high school located in a single complex along U.S. Highway 61 in unincorporated Louisa County, Iowa, with a Letts postal address.

The district is named Louisa–Muscatine because it is on the border of Louisa and Muscatine counties.

The district, occupying sections of both counties, includes the cities of Letts, Grandview, and Fruitland as well as a portion of the city limits of Muscatine. It also includes Cranston, an unincorporated area, as well as students from various other local communities.

History

The district was formed in 1959 as the consolidation of Letts and Grandview schools.

In 2014, Ky Cochran of the Muscatine Journal wrote that the district "continues to face financial difficulties", and that the superintendent asked the board to not increase his own salary while the board was to increase the salaries of other staff.

Facilities
The campus consists of a preschool through 6th grade elementary building and a 7th through 12th grade secondary building. It is located south of Muscatine, Iowa and is three miles away from Letts.

The athletic facilities at the campus include a baseball and softball complex and an American football and track center.

Jr./Sr. High School
The Jr./Sr. High School was built in 1963 and has had three additions and a major renovation.

Louisa–Muscatine is involved in the School-to-Work (STW) initiative with Muscatine Community Schools and the Muscatine area business and industry.

Athletics
The Falcons compete in the Southeast Iowa Superconference in the following sports:
Cross country
Volleyball
Football
Wrestling
Basketball
Bowling
 Girls' 2008 class 1A state champions
Track and field
Golf
Soccer
Baseball
Softball

See also
List of school districts in Iowa
List of high schools in Iowa

References

External links
 Louisa–Muscatine Community School District

School districts in Iowa
Education in Louisa County, Iowa
Education in Muscatine County, Iowa
1959 establishments in Iowa
School districts established in 1959